Eriopidion is a genus of flowering plant in the family Lamiaceae, first described  as a genus in 1976. It contains only one known species, Eriopidion strictum. It is native to Venezuela and Brazil.

References

Lamiaceae
Flora of South America
Monotypic Lamiaceae genera